Hamma Bouziane is a town and commune in Constantine Province, Algeria. According to the 2008 census it has a population of 83.603.

References 

Communes of Constantine Province
Province seats of Algeria
Constantine Province